The Federal Data Protection and Information Commissioner (FDPIC) is responsible to advise, educate and ensure the protection of personal data in Switzerland. It is established by the Federal Act on Data Protection and by the Federal Act on Freedom of Information in the Administration.

The Federal Data Protection and Information Commissioner is responsible for the supervision of federal authorities and private bodies with respect to data protection and freedom of information legislation. It is affiliated with the Federal Chancellery of Switzerland.

The cantons also have data protection and information commissioners.

History 

The position of Federal Data Protection Commissioner was created in 1993, with the entry in force (on 1 July 1993) of the Federal Act on Data Protection of 19 June 1992.

The position  was renamed Federal Data Protection and Information Commissioner in 2006, with the entry in force (on 1 July 2006) of the Federal Act on Freedom of Information in the Administration of 17 December 2004.

The commissioner is appointed by the Federal Council (for a term of office of four years) and approved by a vote of the Federal Assembly.

Commissioners 

 1993-2001: Odilo Guntern (substitute: Jean-Philippe Walter)
 2001-2015: Hanspeter Thür (substitute: Jean-Philippe Walter)
 2015-2016: Jean-Philippe Walter, ad interim (substitute: Marc Buntschu)
 Since 2016: Adrian Lobsiger (substitute: Jean-Philippe Walter)

See also 
 Federal Commissioner for Data Protection and Freedom of Information (Germany)
 Google Street View privacy concerns (Switzerland)
 Personally identifiable information (Switzerland)
 Information privacy
 Information commissioner

References

External links 
 
 Federal Act on Data Protection
 Federal Act on Freedom of Information in the Administration

Federal Chancellery of Switzerland
Data protection authorities